Kenny Adeshigbin (born 12 February 1991 in Atlanta, Georgia, United States) is an American soccer player who is last known to have played for Asteras Vlahioti FC in the Greek gamma ethniki. He has listed his speed, strength, and finishing as his strong points.

Career

Trinidad and Tobago

One of new Point Fortin Civics new additions for the 2016-17 TT Pro League, Adeshigbin was first introduced in the opening round where Civic were overcome 3-1, almost supplying an assist in the 54th minute before being fouled in his second game on the 43rd minute which caused him to be stretchered off.

Sweden

Supplying two goals on his IK Arvika Fotboll debut in 2014 to help them overcome Vänersborgs IF 2-0, Adeshigbin then joined Vänersborgs IF at the beginning of 2015, received well by this teammates and aiming to "add an extra dimension to the team" as well as to aid them in promotion to the Division 1. he was almost traded to Karlstad BK but was deregistered by VFK during June 2016 due to paper work issues. Next, the Atlanta local came to terms on a move to Säffle FF in spring 2017.

Personal life

The forward's father, a former footballer in Nigeria, engendered his love for soccer and his sister, Taiwo Adeshigbin, practiced the sport during college as well as overseas.

References

External links 
 Fogis.se
 Socawarriors Profile 
 NJCAA Profile

American soccer players
American expatriate soccer players
Expatriate footballers in Trinidad and Tobago
Living people
American sportspeople of Nigerian descent
American expatriate sportspeople in Trinidad and Tobago
1991 births
Perimeter College at Georgia State University alumni
TT Pro League players
Point Fortin Civic F.C. players
Association football forwards
Expatriate footballers in England
Expatriate footballers in Sweden
American expatriate sportspeople in England
American expatriate sportspeople in Sweden
Soccer players from Atlanta
Atlanta Silverbacks players